Namie Amuro Best Fiction Tour 2008–2009 was the tenth concert tour by Japanese recording artist Namie Amuro in support of her greatest hits album, Best Fiction (2008). The tour began on October 25, 2008 at Makuhari Messe Event Hall in Chiba, Japan and ended on July 12, 2009 at the Shanghai Grand Stage in Shanghai, China. The tour broke attendance records for Japanese solo female artists, playing to almost 500,000 fans across Japan, China and Taiwan.

Itinerary 

The initial tour dates were announced on May 27, 2008 with 25 stops in 15 cities across Japan. An additional 15 dates and an additional city were added on August 18, 2008 before the start of the tour.

On October 25, 2008, the tour began in Chiba, Japan at the Makuhari Messe Event Hall and continued through December 21, 2008 at Aoi-mori Arena in Aomori, Japan. Another round of 20 additional dates were added on December 29, 2008, bringing the total amount of dates in Japan to 60. The second leg of the tour began on January 14, 2009 at Sendai Hot House Arena in Miyagi, Japan and played its final show in on 31 May at the Morioka Ice Arena in Iwate, Japan.

On March 22, 2009, it was announced that the tour would be headed towards the Asian continent with four additional shows in Taiwan and China set respectively in June and July. Overall, the tour spanned a total of 10 months, 64 dates, 3 countries, with a total attendance of an estimated 500,000 people.

Set list
The set list for the Best Fiction tour includes 16 of the 17 songs included on the Best Fiction compilation album. Several album songs from her two most recent studio albums, Queen of Hip-Pop (2005) and Play (2007) were also included. "Luvotomy" and "Black Diamond," originally collaborations with other artists are performed as solo versions. "Say the Word" released in 2001 is the oldest song included on the set list. It is only one of two songs including "Wishing on the Same Star" to be released before her transition to R&B music. This is her first tour to exclude any of her songs released with former producer, Tetsuya Komuro.

When the tour began on October 28, 2008, Amuro performed 28 songs. "Wild" and "Dr." were added to the set list prior to the release of their respective single on March 18, 2009.

Do Me More
Violet Sauce
Alarm
So Crazy
New Look
Hello
Girl Talk
Shine More
Full Moon
Luvotomy
Put 'Em Up
It's All About You
Wishing on the Same Star
Rock Steady
Funky Town
No
Say the Word
Dr.
Wild
White Light
Hide & Seek
Queen of Hip-Pop
Sexy Girl
Want Me, Want Me
Top Secret
Black Diamond
What a Feeling
WoWa
Can't Sleep, Can't Eat, I'm Sick
Baby Don't Cry

Tour dates

DVD

The live music video of the tour was released on September 9, 2009. The video captures her dates in June at the Taipei Arena in Taiwan. It was her first overseas concert to have been filmed for commercial release. In the first week of the release, the live video sold about 155,000 copies on DVD format and 14,000 copies on Blu-ray format, making her the first artist to top both charts at the same time in Japanese Oricon charts history.  it has sold about 260,510 copies on DVD format.

It was released as a DVD and Blu-ray on September 9, 2009. The DVD version is a limited edition and is exclusively packaged in a digipak with a slipcover. It will be sold until September 30, 2009. It is currently not known if a regular edition of the DVD will be printed afterward.

Personnel 

 Executive producer: Takashi Kasuga, Masato "Max" Matsumoto, Shinji Hayashi, Katsuro Ohshita, Hajime Tanguchi
 Staging producer: Izumi Matsuzawa
 Staging director: Fuyuki Yamamoto
 Sound production: Nao'ymt
 Art director: Hidekazu "Kazoo" Sato
 Public relations: Yukio Takemura, Akira Kobayashi, Masahiro Tashiro, Shintaro Higuchi, Tatsuya Ikeda, Yu Koiguchi
 A&R: Hiromi Amano
 Artist management: Rika Yasumoto
 Dancer management: Yumiko Ochiai
 Merchandising: Kazuo Ueno

Band 
 Bass: Tsuyoshi Ishikawa
 Drums: Mitsuru Kurauchi
 Guitar: Shinji Ohmura
 Keyboards: Shigeo Komori
 Dancers: Tetsuharu, Hide, Yusuke, Hossy, Mittan, Nao, Natsumi, Asuka, Hiromi, Manami

Crew

Staging 
 Stage set designer: Kazutomo Yamamura
 Stage set coordinator: Naoto Hori
 Chief carpenter: Tadahiro Nakamurara
 Carpenters: Yasushi Shimazaki, Taiki Takeyama, Yasushi Oomori, Katsutoshi Miyazi, Hiroshi Hasegawa, Kentaro Minami, Ryosuke Fukushima, Tetsuya Sunahra, Yoshio Hayashi, Yoshito Amano, Rikiya Nakada, Tatsunori Kazikawa, Ryoutaro Komatsu
 P.A. crew: Keiji Shigeta, Maso Toba, Hideo Sato, Hiroki Kamehama, Nanae Ito, Marie Adachi, Syouji Yuzawa, Kana Doi
 Lighting designer: Hideki Maki
 Lighting coordinator: Osamu Yamaguchi
 Lighting operator: Satoshi Hatakenaka, Minoru Otaki, Hiroko Toya, Takeshi Ogihara, Seiichirou Kishi
 Illumination coordinator: Akihiko Hayashi
 Illumination operator: Nao Kuremura, Nozomi Ito
 Visual art planner & operator: Takeshi Yoshimoto
 Visual operator: Satoru Terao, Hiroyuki Ono, Eiko Iijiri, Keisuke Dohi, Makoto Kurosawa, Yuu Sasaki, Shigemi Todoroki
 Manipulator: Akihisa Murakami
 Manipulator assistant: Yasuo Kitahara, Tatsuya Nagatake
 Instrument coordinator: Shigemi Otake
 Instrument tech: Kenichi Saito, Hideki Nagaoka, Hideki Nagaoka, Kazuya Takahashi
 Special effect coordinator: Takayuki Komine
 Special effect operator: Akiko Mitasaki, Hiroyuki Mochizuki

Costuming 
 Hair & Make-up: Satomi Kurihara, Eriko Ishida
 Stylist: Shinichi Mita
 Wardrobe: Rie Yamazaki, Yuri Yamaguchi

Video 
 Creative director & planner: Hidekasu "Kazoo" Sato
 Director: Yasuhiko Shimizu, Yuchi Kodama, Yoshiya Okoyama, Sachi Sawada
 Producer: Kentaro Kinoshita
 Production manager: Hideki Harada
 Coordinator: Go Kato
 Camera: Takeshi Hanzawa
 Art: Mamoru Furumoto
 Costume Designer: Hiroko Sogawa
 Hair & Make-up: Asami Nemoto
 Make-up creator: Shoichiro Matsuoka
 Model: Amber Thompson

Extras
Best Non Fiction (Off shot)

See also
Namie Amuro Best Fiction Tour 2008-2009

References

2008 concert tours
2009 concert tours
Concert tours of Japan
Concert tours of Asia
2009 live albums
Albums recorded at the Taipei Arena